WPGH-TV (channel 53) is a television station in Pittsburgh, Pennsylvania, United States, affiliated with the Fox network. It is owned by Sinclair Broadcast Group alongside MyNetworkTV affiliate WPNT (channel 22). Both stations share studios on Ivory Avenue in the city's Summer Hill neighborhood, where WPGH-TV's transmitter is also located.

History

Early history of channel 53 (1953–1971)
The station originally signed on the air with a test pattern on July 14, 1953 as WKJF-TV, with regular programming starting August 1, becoming Pittsburgh's first UHF television station. The studio and transmitter facilities of both WKJF-TV and WKJF-FM (now KDKA-FM), were located at 1715 Grandview Avenue in Pittsburgh's Duquesne Heights section. WKJF-TV carried some NBC programming declined by their primary affiliate WDTV.

Southwestern Pennsylvania is a very rugged dissected plateau, and compared to VHF, UHF stations typically do not get good reception in rugged terrain. In addition, WKJF-TV was operating at very low power while awaiting delivery of a high-power transmitter. The transmitter upgrade never took place, which severely degraded the reception and area of coverage. At the time, UHF stations could only be seen with a separately purchased converter and UHF antenna (television sets were not required to have UHF tuners until 1964, after passage of the All-Channel Receiver Act), and even then the picture quality was spotty at best. WKJF-TV was certainly no exception to this, with much of Pittsburgh actually receiving better reception from Johnstown's NBC affiliate, WJAC-TV, a VHF station that appeared in the TV listings along with local stations.

The station never thrived against Pittsburgh's then-only VHF station, WDTV (channel 2, now KDKA-TV) which had the additional advantage of affiliation with all the major networks, DuMont, NBC, CBS and ABC. In June 1954, the Federal Communications Commission (FCC) gave WKJF-TV permission to go off the air on July 2 for ninety days pending the outcome of a Senate subcommittee investigation into UHF television. WKJF-TV never signed back on. Pittsburgh would eventually get individual network affiliates when two commercial VHF stations signed on, WIIC-TV (channel 11, now WPXI), in 1957 with NBC and WTAE-TV (channel 4) in 1958 with ABC.

On February 12, 1965, the FCC announced that an application was filed to sell the Channel 53 construction permit (now with call letters WAND-TV) from Agnes Jane Reeves Greer to Daniel H. Overmyer for consideration of $28,000, with the FCC granting approval of the sale on July 28, 1965. Mr. Overmyer was planning a group of UHF stations to be part of the Overmyer Network which was intended to begin programming in 1967. The Pittsburgh station call letters were changed to WECO-TV for one of his daughters, Elizabeth Clark Overmyer.

Channel 53 remained silent for nearly 15 years, it returned to the air under new owners U.S. Communications Corporation on February 1, 1969 as independent station WPGH-TV. It was jointly owned by the U.S. Communications Corporation (a subsidiary of AVC Corporation) station group of Philadelphia holding an 80% interest and the remaining 20% by D.H. Overmyer. Mr. Overmyer had previously sold the majority interest (80%) in his construction permits for stations in Atlanta, Cincinnati, San Francisco, Pittsburgh and Houston to AVC on March 28, 1967, with FCC approval of their sale coming December 8, 1967. None of the stations were on the air at the time of their sale to AVC. U.S. Communications also operated WPHL-TV in Philadelphia, WATL-TV in Atlanta, WXIX-TV in Cincinnati and KEMO-TV (now KOFY-TV) in San Francisco. WPGH-TV signed on from its new studio and transmitter location at 750 Ivory Avenue, just north of the city of Pittsburgh. This location had been the home of another Pittsburgh station, WENS, which went off the air in 1957. WPGH-TV still broadcasts from this location today.

To overcome the UHF terrain problem that plagued WKJF-TV, WPGH was only the second station to use the most powerful UHF-TV transmitter available at that time, an RCA 110 kW model TTU-110. Despite excellent signal quality and a well-programmed lineup, financial problems continued to trouble the station, leading U.S. Communications Corporation to take WPGH-TV off the air on August 16, 1971.

As an independent station (1974–1986)
Under technical leadership of chief engineer Robert Boyd, broadcast engineer James G. Miller, and others, the station was repaired and updated in 1973. WPGH-TV was finally back on-air for good on January 14, 1974, after being sold again in December 1973 to Pittsburgh Telecasting, Inc., a company headed by Leon Crosby, who had acquired off-the-air San Francisco station KEMO-TV just two years before. Crosby had been working on the deal for more than a year before the sale was finalized. Coincidentally, KEMO-TV, like WPGH-TV, had been a U.S. Communications property.

Initially, the station broadcast for 10 hours daily, beginning at around 2 p.m. The station gradually added more hours to its programming lineup, broadcasting about 18 hours a day by the end of the decade.

The deep bass and melodious voice of announcer William C. Trushel II was often heard during station identification and other audio spots. It was a typical independent station airing cartoons, off-network sitcoms and dramas, movies, and religious programs.

WPGH-TV also became known for some locally produced programming fare. Using a similar strategy for producing local programs on KEMO-TV, Crosby believed in creative types willing to cross-train and work cheap very early in their careers, and packaged the shows in a way to make them more attractive to advertisers.

Among the more successful programs included a Polka dance show videotaped at the WPGH-TV studios, and attempting to copy the popular Chiller Theatre program on NBC competitor WIIC-TV, it aired Thing Theater; a show produced around B-grade horror movies, hosted by a man calling himself "Scorpio". The show aired on Saturday afternoons until the station began clearing college football games. In its early years, the station also cleared CBS, ABC, and NBC programs that KDKA-TV, WTAE-TV, and WIIC-TV passed on.

The Meredith Corporation purchased WPGH-TV in 1978 and added stronger shows and some first-run syndicated talk shows to the station. It also gradually added more recent off-network sitcoms. With WPTT-TV (channel 22, now WPNT) now in the competition, WPGH-TV put in very high bids for programming and even overpaid for some in order to prevent shows from ending up on WPTT-TV. That practice, however, caused the station to become unprofitable despite its high ratings. As a result, Meredith put WPGH-TV up for sale in 1985. The Sinclair Broadcast Group (owner of WPTT-TV) put in a bid so it could combine assets and sell WPTT-TV to the Home Shopping Network (HSN). However, it was outbid by Lorimar-Telepictures which took over the station in 1986.

Fox affiliation (1986–present)
WPGH-TV became Pittsburgh's charter Fox affiliate upon the network's October 9, 1986 launch; the station was sold to Renaissance Broadcasting in 1987 after Lorimar-Telepictures reduced the purchase price from $35 million to $21.5 million. As a Fox affiliate, WPGH-TV continued to receive very high ratings. However, it also continued to overpay for programming, keeping it in the red. It was put up for sale again in 1990, and this time, Sinclair was the successful buyer. However, the group struggled to obtain financing, so it worked out a deal to sell WPTT-TV to its general manager and longtime employee Eddie Edwards. Sinclair took over operations of WPGH-TV through a local marketing agreement (one of the earliest such LMAs to be formed) in the fall of 1991 and moved the best programming on WPTT-TV's schedule to WPGH-TV. The former then became a full-time Home Shopping Network affiliate at midnight on August 30, 1991, with plans of gradually adding entertainment programming.

WPGH-TV had a huge inventory of programming, but with Fox stepping up its programming, it soon ran out of timeslots to run a large amount of it. So beginning on January 6, 1992, WPGH-TV began running shows on WPTT-TV that it lacked the time to run itself. WPGH-TV bought the 3 p.m. to midnight time period on WPTT-TV. That station continued running HSN for fifteen hours a day. In 1993, WPGH-TV programmed WPTT-TV daily from noon to midnight. Beginning in 1995, it controlled the entire day's programming on WPTT-TV, except for a few hours in the overnight. WPGH-TV then added more first-run syndicated talk and reality shows along with recent cartoons, and sitcoms, while WPTT-TV ran older classic sitcoms, cartoons, movies, drama shows, and some recent sitcoms.

In 1998, to coincide with the launch of its news department the year prior, WPGH-TV launched a new logo based around the colors of black and gold to match that of the city's local sports teams. The station, under various forms of the logo, still use it today, and would later be copied by fellow Fox affiliate and sister station WTTE in Columbus, Ohio, who in 2000 adopted a similar logo in a scarlet and gray color scheme to match the Ohio State Buckeyes.

WPGH-TV and WPTT-TV (the latter has changed its call letters to WCWB after gaining the WB affiliation from WNPA, channel 19, now WPCW) moved into the same building in 1997 and eventually became officially co-owned by Sinclair in 2000 after the FCC relaxed its media ownership rules to allow one company to own two television stations in the same market, provided the market has at least eight full-power stations and that neither of the two stations involved in the duopoly is among the four highest-rated.

By 2002, WPGH-TV was no longer running cartoons after the Fox Kids weekday lineup was discontinued around the country. It focused now on court shows, talk shows, reality shows, and off-network sitcoms along with Fox programming. Until 2007, the station served as the de facto affiliate for the Wheeling, West Virginia/Steubenville, Ohio market. Although it is still carried on area cable systems, CBS affiliate WTRF-TV added a primary Fox and secondary MyNetworkTV affiliation on a new digital subchannel; sister station WTOV-TV later acquired the Fox affiliation for their second subchannel in 2014. It can also be seen in some parts of the Clarksburg/Weston/Morgantown, West Virginia market, even though that area is served by WVFX.

On May 15, 2012, Sinclair Broadcast Group and Fox agreed to a five-year extension to the network's affiliation agreement with Sinclair's 19 Fox stations, including WPGH-TV, allowing them to continue carrying Fox programming through 2017.

Since acquiring the rights to the NFL's NFC broadcasts in 1994, WPGH-TV normally airs two Pittsburgh Steelers games each season (when they host an NFC team at Heinz Field). A change in the NFL broadcasting contracts for the 2014 NFL season allowing cross-network flex-scheduling allows WPGH-TV the opportunity to broadcast more Steelers games, but as of 2017, the NFL has not yet cross-flexed a Steelers game from CBS (KDKA-TV, in turn) to Fox (and to WPGH, in turn). The Steelers 2018 Sunday night matchup with the Oakland Raiders, however, was flexed out into the afternoon and will air on Fox, giving WPGH-TV its first all-AFC Steelers matchup.

Averted loss of Fox affiliation
On May 8, 2017, Sinclair announced that it would acquire Tribune Media for $3.9 billion. The deal is expected to receive FCC approval sometime in the first half of 2018. The deal has brought concerns by Fox who see Sinclair as a competitor towards conservative-leaning news, as well as increased leverage by Sinclair on reverse compensation to air Fox programming.

On August 2, 2017, it was reported that Fox Television Stations was in talks with Ion Media to create a joint venture that would own their respective stations. The partnership was said to include plans to shift affiliations from Sinclair stations in favor of Ion-owned stations, such as those whose affiliation agreements are soon to expire. In Pittsburgh's case, this would include shifting Fox from WPGH-TV to WINP-TV, which would mark the first Big Four television network affiliation switch in the Pittsburgh market since Westinghouse Electric Corporation purchased KDKA-TV (then WDTV) from the DuMont Television Network in late 1954 and dropping that station's DuMont programming for CBS, and the first threat of a Big Four affiliation change since Westinghouse mulled switching KDKA-TV to NBC during the 1994 United States broadcast TV realignment when its Group W arm was looking for a group affiliation deal. In the event that WPGH-TV loses its Fox affiliation, the station may return to independent status.

The chances of WPGH-TV keeping its Fox affiliation increased in October 2017 when Ion elected its stations to have must-carry status instead of retransmission consent, which the FCC ruled Ion must keep for three years. However, must-carry only applies to a main signal, allowing Fox to possibly affiliate with a digital subchannel on WINP-TV and other Ion stations.

On December 6, 2017, it was reported that Sinclair and Fox were working on a deal that would see its Fox affiliates renew their affiliation agreement in exchange for Sinclair selling some of its Fox affiliates directly to Fox Television Stations. The deal would see between six and ten Fox affiliates owned by Sinclair and Tribune (all in markets with an NFL team) become Fox owned-and-operated stations. It is not known if WPGH-TV will be one of the stations sold, although the stations being sold to Fox are expected to be from Tribune Media (notably KCPQ in Seattle, where Sinclair already owns KOMO-TV), many of which were previously owned by Fox. A sale to Fox would make WPGH-TV the third O&O station in the Pittsburgh market alongside KDKA-TV and WPCW. It was later reported that sister station WPNT might be included in the deal as well. On May 9, 2018, Sinclair announced that seven Fox affiliates would be sold to FTS, but WPGH-TV was not included and an affiliation renewal was announced for that station instead, keeping WPGH-TV and WPNT with Sinclair.

News operation

Under Meredith ownership, WPGH-TV aired locally produced newscasts anchored by Tom Peterson, Mavis Logan, Tim Sohier and others, with varying degrees of success. One such show, Good Day Pittsburgh, aired with a similar format to that of contemporary show Pittsburgh 2Day on KDKA-TV. Some of the staff were alumni of WYTV in nearby Youngstown, Ohio. The newscasts would remain in some form until Sinclair acquired the station and eliminated the news department.

Under Sinclair ownership, WPGH-TV established a news department on January 28, 1997, with the debut of a nightly prime time newscast called the Fox 53 Ten O'Clock News. This program was launched to compete with NBC affiliate WPXI's Pittsburgh Cable News Channel (PCNC), which also offered a 10 p.m. news broadcast in that timeslot. In August 2001, UPN affiliate WNPA launched Pittsburgh's third 10 p.m. newscast, produced by CBS station KDKA-TV.

Sinclair downsized and converted WPGH-TV's news operation into its centralized News Central production on April 21, 2003. As a result, the station's weather department was shut down. National news headlines, weather forecasts, and some sports segments originated from Sinclair's corporate headquarters on Beaver Dam Road in Hunt Valley, Maryland. However, local news and sports segments remained based at WPGH-TV's studios.

On January 12, 2006, WPGH-TV shuttered its in-house news department and entered into a news share agreement with WPXI-TV (owned by Cox Media Group) to take over production of the prime time newscast on WPGH. Essentially, PCNC's 10 p.m. show moved over to WPGH-TV. All of WPGH-TV's locally based news staff, except for sportscaster Alby Oxenreiter (who was eventually hired by WPXI full-time), were laid off as a result. The news share agreement with WPXI resulted in WPGH-TV becoming the largest Fox station by market size that outsources its local news programming in lieu of producing its own newscasts; it's also the second largest "Big Four" affiliate (after WPGH-TV's sister station KDNL-TV in St. Louis) that doesn't produce its own newscasts. Channel 11 News on Fox 53 at 10 debuted just over two weeks later on January 30, 2006; the program originates from WPXI's studios on Evergreen Road in Pittsburgh's Summer Hill neighborhood, next to the US 19 Truck/I-279 interchange. It airs Sunday through Friday nights for 45 minutes, followed by a fifteen-minute sports highlight show called Ox on Fox Sports Extra (hosted by Alby Oxenreiter). On Saturdays, the newscast is 30 minutes long. On October 6, 2007, WPXI began broadcasting its local newscasts in high definition, the WPGH-TV shows were included in the upgrade.

Unlike other Sinclair-owned stations with outsourced newscasts, WPGH-TV is permitted to air Sinclair's must-run programming as part of the newscasts, but must air them after the WPXI-produced newscast with a brief disclaimer stating that the editorials are from Sinclair and not WPXI; as a result, WPGH does not air Sinclair's must-runs, though it does air other political programming from Sinclair in prime time during election years due to Pennsylvania's status as a swing state. Because WPGH-TV no longer operates its own news department, Pittsburgh isn't available as a local option for Sinclair's streaming service Stirr, defaulting to WJLA-TV in Washington, D.C., though neighboring WJAC-TV and WTOV-TV are available as alternate options.

Since August 2016, the WPXI newscasts have been repeated at midnight on sister WPNT.

On January 18, 2021, WPGH-TV began airing the Sinclair-produced The National Desk, a national morning news program similar in format to Nexstar Media Group's NewsNation on WGN America in that it sources its news from local stations within Sinclair. None of Sinclair's must-run editorials will air during The National Desk.

On March 14, 2022, Channel 11 News on Fox 53 at 6:30 debuted, replacing a second hour of You Bet Your Life with Jay Leno.

Notable current on-air staff
Lisa Sylvester – anchor

Notable former on-air staff
Kurt Angle – sportscaster (1997–1998), 1996 Olympic gold medalist and Mt. Lebanon native who served as a sportscaster after winning two gold medals in freestyle wrestling, before moving on to a successful career in professional wrestling with the WWE and Impact Wrestling.
Kevin Benson (AMS Seal of Approval) – meteorologist

Technical information

Subchannels
The station's digital signal is multiplexed:

Analog-to-digital conversion
Along with all Sinclair-owned stations, WPGH-TV shut down its analog signal, over UHF channel 53, on February 17, 2009, the original date in which full-power television stations in the United States were to transition from analog to digital broadcasts under federal mandate (the deadline was later extended to June 12). The station's digital signal continued to broadcast on its pre-transition UHF channel 43. Through the use of PSIP, digital television receivers display the station's virtual channel as its former UHF analog channel 53, which was among the high band UHF channels (52–69) that were removed from broadcasting use as a result of the transition. It was one of three stations in Pittsburgh to discontinue normal programming on their analog signals on the original transition date, alongside sister station WPNT and then-WQED-owned WQEX (now WINP-TV).

As part of the SAFER Act, WPGH-TV and WPNT kept their analog signals on the air until March 19 to inform viewers of the digital television transition through a loop of public service announcements from the National Association of Broadcasters. Due to the early sign-off, this made WPGH-TV one of the only stations broadcasting among channels 52–69 participating in the SAFER Act as that part of the spectrum would be removed from broadcasting use immediately after June 12 to be freed up for other uses.

References

External links

Television stations in Pittsburgh
Fox network affiliates
Antenna TV affiliates
Charge! (TV network) affiliates
Sinclair Broadcast Group
Television channels and stations established in 1953
1953 establishments in Pennsylvania
National Hockey League over-the-air television broadcasters
Former Meredith Corporation subsidiaries
Telepictures